{{DISPLAYTITLE:List of C4 plants}}

 plants use the  carbon fixation pathway to increase their photosynthetic efficiency by reducing or suppressing photorespiration, which mainly occurs under low atmospheric  concentration, high light, high temperature, drought, and salinity. There are roughly 8,100 known  species, which belong to at least 61 distinct evolutionary lineages in 19 families (as per APG IV classification) of flowering plants. Among these are important crops such as maize, sorghum and sugarcane, but also weeds and invasive plants. Although only 3% of flowering plant species use  carbon fixation, they account for 23% of global primary production. The repeated, convergent  evolution from  ancestors has spurred hopes to bio-engineer the  pathway into  crops such as rice.

 photosynthesis probably first evolved 30–35 million years ago in the Oligocene, and further origins occurred since, most of them in the last 15 million years.  plants are mainly found in tropical and warm-temperate regions, predominantly in open grasslands where they are often dominant. While most are graminoids, other growth forms such as forbs, vines, shrubs, and even some trees and aquatic plants are also known among  plants.

 plants are usually identified by their higher 13C/12C isotopic ratio compared to  plants or their typical leaf anatomy. The distribution of  lineages among plants has been determined through phylogenetics and was considered well known . Monocots – mainly grasses (Poaceae) and sedges (Cyperaceae) – account for around 80% of  species, but they are also found in the eudicots.

The following list presents known  lineages by family, based on the overview by Sage (2016). They correspond to single species or clades thought to have acquired the  pathway independently. In some lineages that also include  and – intermediate species, the  pathway may have evolved more than once.

Acanthaceae

The large acanthus family Acanthaceae includes one genus with  species, found in dry habitats from Africa to Asia.

Blepharis – 15  species, 1–4 origins

Aizoaceae

While many species in the ice plant family Aizoaceae use crassulacean acid metabolism (CAM), one subfamily with drought-tolerant and halophytic plants includes  species:

Sesuvioideae – 30  species, 1–6 origins

Amaranthaceae

The amaranth family Amaranthaceae (including the former goosefoot family Chenopodiaceae) contains around 800 known  species, which belong to 14 distinct lineages in seven subfamilies. This makes Amaranthaceae the family with most  species and lineages among the eudicots. Suaeda aralocaspica and species of the genus Bienertia use a particular, single-cell type of  carbon fixation.

Aerva (Amaranthoideae) – 4  species
Alternanthera (Gomphrenoideae) – 17  species (also includes – intermediates)
Amaranthus (Amaranthoideae) – 90  species
Atriplex (Chenopodioideae) – around 180  species
Bassia–Camphorosma clade (Camphorosmoideae) – 24  species (also includes one – intermediate), 1–2 origins
Bienertia (Suaedoideae) – 3  species
Caroxyleae (syn. Caroxyloneae, Salsoloideae) – 157  species
Gomphrenoids (Gomphrenoideae) – 138  species
Salsoleae (Salsoloideae) – 158  species, 2–4 origins
Suaeda aralocaspica (Suaedoideae)
Suaeda sect. Salsina – 30  species
Suaeda sect. Schoberia – 9  species
Tecticornia – (Salicornioideae) 2  species
Tidestromia (Gomphrenoideae) – 8  species

Asteraceae

The composite family Asteraceae contains three  lineages, in two different tribes of subfamily Asteroideae.

Flaveria (Tageteae) – 7  species, 2–3 origins  (also includes  and intermediate)
Coreopsideae – 41  species
Pectis (Tageteae) – 90  species

Boraginaceae
The borage family Boraginaceae contains one widespread  genus, Euploca, which has also been treated as part of a distinct family Heliotropiaceae.

Euploca (also includes – intermediates) – 130  species, 1–3 origins

Cleomaceae

The Cleomaceae, formerly included in the caper family Capparaceae, contains three  species in genus Cleome. These three species independently acquired the  pathway; the genus also contains numerous  as well as – intermediate species.

Cleome angustifolia
C. gynandra
C. oxalidea

Caryophyllaceae

In the carnation family Caryophyllaceae, the  pathway evolved once, in a clade within the polyphyletic genus Polycarpaea.

Polycarpaea – 20  species

Cyperaceae

The sedge family Cyperaceae is second only to the grasses in number of  species. Prominent  sedges include culturally important species such as papyrus (Cyperus papyrus) and chufa (C. esculentus) but also purple nutsedge (C. rotundus), one of the world's major weeds. Eleocharis vivipara uses  carbon fixation in underwater leaves and  carbon fixation in aerial leaves.

Bulbostylis – 211  species
Cyperus – 757  species
Eleocharis ser. Tenuissimae – 10  species
Eleocharis vivipara
Fimbristylis – 303  species
Rhynchospora – 40  species

Euphorbiaceae

The spurge family Euphorbiaceae contains the largest single  lineage among eudicots. The  spurges are diverse and widespread; they range from weedy herbs to the only known  trees – four species from Hawaii, including Euphorbia olowaluana (up to 10 m) and E. herbstii (up to 8 m).

Euphorbia subgenus Chamaesyce section Anisophyllum (also treated as genus Chamaesyce) – 350  species (also including  and – intermediate species)

Gisekiaceae

Contains a  genus with a single species.

Gisekia pharnaceoides

Hydrocharitaceae

Includes the only known aquatic  plants.

Egeria densa
Hydrilla verticillata

Molluginaceae

The two  species within the same genus have acquired the pathway independently.

Mollugo – 2  species, 2 origins

Nyctaginaceae

Allionia – 2  species
Boerhavia – 42  species

Polygonaceae

Calligonum – 80  species

Portulacaceae
The single genus of this family forms one  lineage. CAM photosynthesis is also known. Common purslane (Portulaca oleracea) is a major weed but also a vegetable.
Portulaca – 100  species, 1–2 origins

Poaceae

The grass family includes most of the known  species – around 5000. They are only found in subfamilies of the PACMAD clade. Major  crops such as maize, sugarcane, sorghum and pearl millet belong in this family.

Aristida – 288  species
Stipagrostis – 56  species
Chloridoideae (without Centropodieae) – 1596  species
Centropodia – 4  species
Eriachne – 50  species
Tristachyideae – 87  species
Andropogoneae – 1228  species (incl. maize, sugarcane, sorghum)
Reynaudia filiformis
Axonopus – 90  species
Paspalum – 379  species
Anthaenantia – 4  species
Arthropoginae/Mesosetum clade – 35  species, 1–2 origins
Arthropoginae/Onchorachis clade – 2  species
Arthropoginae/Colaeteania clade – 7  species, 1–2 origins
Anthephorinae – 286  species
Echinochloa – 35  species
Neurachne–Paraneurachne – 2  species, 2 origins
Melinidinae–Panicinae–Cenchrinae – 889  species
Alloteropsis – 5  species, 1–2 origins (incl.  and intermediate)

Scrophulariaceae

Anticharis – 4  species

Zygophyllaceae

Tribuloideae – 37  species, 1–2 origins
Tetraena simplex

References

Photosynthesis
Lists of plants